Bradyrhizobium erythrophlei is a bacterium from the genus of Bradyrhizobium which has been isolated from the nodules of the tree Erythrophleum fordii.

References

Nitrobacteraceae
Bacteria described in 2015